Fritz Erpenbeck (born: Friedrich Johann Lambert Erpenbeck, 7 April 1897, Mainz – 7 January 1975, Berlin) was a German writer, director and actor.

Biography 
Erpenbeck was born in to the family of a watchmaker and engineer. He trained as a locksmith in Osnabrück  where he also took acting lessons. He volunteered for the in to the army during the First World War and after his return he continued working as a locksmith. Erpenbeck was in various engagements, including at the Lessingtheater and the Piscator stage in Berlin, where he also worked as a director and dramaturge. In 1927 he married the writer Hedda Zinner. From 1927 he was a member of the Communist Party of Germany (KPD). From 1929 he also worked as a journalist; from 1931 to 1933 he was editor-in-chief of the satirical magazine Roter Pfeffer.

In 1933 he emigrated first to Prague, in 1935 to the Soviet Union with his wife. There he worked as an editor for various magazines and became a member of the National Committee for a Free Germany (NKFD). As part of his work for the NKFD, he was deputy editor-in-chief of the NKFD broadcaster Freies Deutschland. Because of this function, he was chosen for the Ulbricht group.

On 30 April 1945, before the end of the war, Erpenbeck returned with her to Germany, where he joined the Socialist Unity Party (SED) in 1946. He founded Henschelverlag with Bruno Henschel and was editor-in-chief of the magazines Theater der Zeit and Theaterdienst from 1946 to 1958, both of which were published by Henschelverlag. From 1951 he was head of the main department for performing arts and music at the GDR Council of Ministers.

From 1959 to 1962 he was chief dramaturge at the Berlin Volksbühne, after which he lived as a freelance writer.

In 1956 Erpenbeck received the Lessing Prize of the GDR, in 1957 the Ernst Moritz Arndt Medal and in 1972 the clasp of honor for the Patriotic Order of Merit.

Erpenbeck died on 7 January 1975 in Berlin and was buried in the Dorotheenstadt Cemetery. A street in Berlin-Pankow is named after him.

Family 
Fritz Erpenbeck was the father of the physicist, philosopher and writer John Erpenbeck, whose daughter Jenny Erpenbeck also became known as a writer.

References 

1897 births
1975 deaths
Writers from Mainz
German writers
German theatre directors
German actors
20th-century German screenwriters
20th-century German male actors
Communist Party of Germany politicians
Socialist Unity Party of Germany politicians
East German actors
East German journalists
East German writers
Emigrants from Nazi Germany
National Committee for a Free Germany members
Emigrants from Nazi Germany to Czechoslovakia
German crime fiction writers
Recipients of the Patriotic Order of Merit (honor clasp)
German theatre critics